Grace Maccarone is a children’s book editor and author, notably of Miss Lina’s Ballerinas, illustrated by Christine Davenier, and its sequel Miss Lina’s Ballerinas and the Prince. She has also worked as an editor at Scholastic, Wireless Generation, and currently Holiday House.

Partial bibliography
 The Haunting of Grade Three, illustrated by Kelly Oechsli, Scholastic, 1987
 Itchy, Itchy Chicken Pox, illustrated by Betsy Lewin, Cartwheel, 1992
 The Sword in the Stone, illustrated by Joe Boddy, Scholastic, 1992
 Oink! Moo! How Do You Do?, illustrated by Hans Wilhelm, Cartwheel, 1994
 Pizza Party, illustrated by Emily Arnold McCully, Scholastic, 1994
 Soccer Game!, by Meredith Johnson, Cartwheel, 1994
 The Classroom Pet, Scholastic, 1995
 My Tooth Is About to Fall Out, illustrated by Betsy Lewin, Cartwheel, 1995
 The First Grade Friends: Lunch Box Surprise, illustrated by Betsy Lewin, Cartwheel, 1995
 Monster Math, illustrated by Marge Hartelius, Scholastic, 1995
 First Grade Friends: Recess Mess, illustrated by Betsy Lewin, Scholastic, 1996	
 Monster Math School Time, illustrated by Marge Hartelius, Scholastic, 1997
 Monster Money, with Marilyn Burns, Cartwheel, 1998
 Monster Math Picnic, Cartwheel, 1998
 Three Pigs, One Wolf, Seven Magic Shapes, illustrated by David Neuhaus, with math activities by Marilyn Burns, Cartwheel, 1998
 What Is That? Said the Cat, illustrated by Jeffrey Scherer, Cartwheel, 1998
 A Child Was Born: A First Nativity Book, illustrated by Sam Williams, Scholastic, 2000
 Dinosaurs, illustrated by Richard Courtney, Scholastic, 2001
 A Child’s Goodnight Prayer, illustrated by Sam Williams, Cartwheel, 2001
 Miss Lina’s Ballerinas, illustrated by Christine Davenier,  Feiwel & Friends, 2010
 Miss Lina’s Ballerinas and the Prince, illustrated by Christine Davenier, Feiwel & Friends, 2011
 Miss Lina’s Ballerinas and the Wicked Wish, illustrated by Christine Davenier, Feiwel & Friends, 2012
 Princess Tales: Once Upon a Time in Rhyme with Seek-and-Find Pictures, illustrated by Gail de Marcken, Feiwel & Friends, 2013
 A Day with Miss Lina's Ballerinas, illustrated by Christine Davenier, Square Fish, 2014

References

Living people
Year of birth missing (living people)